Endless Scroll is the debut studio album by American punk band Bodega. It was released on June 1, 2018 under What's Your Rupture?.

Release
On April 3, 2018, Bodega announced the release of their debut album, along with the single "Can't Knock the Hustle". The next single "Jack In Titanic" was released on May 3, 2018.

Critical reception

Endless Scroll was met with "generally favorable" reviews from critics. At Metacritic, which assigns a weighted average rating out of 100 to reviews from mainstream publications, this release received an average score of 74, based on 13 reviews. Aggregator Album of the Year gave the release a 75 out of 100 based on a critical consensus of 14 reviews.

Accolades

Track listing

References

2018 debut albums
What's Your Rupture? albums